Apocynum androsaemifolium, the fly-trap dogbane or spreading dogbane, is a flowering plant in the Gentianales order. It is common in North America.

Description
Apocynum androsaemifolium is a perennial herb with branching stems, hairs on the underside of the leaves, and no hair on the stems. Milky sap appears on broken stems.

Its leaves appear as pointed ovals, with entire leaf margins and alternate venation. Pairs of pink flowers bloom at the end of stalks between June and September. Two seed pods  in length contain silky-haired seeds.

Taxonomy

Subspecies and varieties
Subspecies and varieties include:
 Apocynum androsaemifolium subsp. androsaemifolium - E Canada, W United States
 Apocynum androsaemifolium var. griseum (Greene) Bég. & Belosersky - Ontario, British Columbia, Washington State, Oregon, Idaho, Indiana, Michigan 
 Apocynum androsaemifolium var. incanum A.DC. - widespread in Canada, United States, NE Mexico
 Apocynum androsaemifolium var. intermedium Woodson - Colorado
 Apocynum androsaemifolium subsp. pumilum (A.Gray) B.Boivin - British Columbia, Washington State, Oregon, Idaho, California, Utah, Montana, Wyoming, Nevada
 Apocynum androsaemifolium var. tomentellum (Greene) B.Boivin - British Columbia, Washington State, Oregon, Idaho, California, Nevada
 Apocynum androsaemifolium var. woodsonii B.Boivin - Alberta, British Columbia, Washington State, Wyoming, Nevada, Idaho

Etymology 
 Apocynum androsaemifolium  Linnaeus. From the Greek 'apo': far from and 'kyôn': dog, because of its toxic effects on dogs; Androsema-leaved  androsaemifolium  (Hypericum androsaemum).

Distribution and habitat 
The plant is widespread across most of Canada, the United States (including Alaska but excluding Florida), and northeast Mexico. Its native habitats include forests, woodlands, forest edges, prairies, meadows, and fields. It prefers dry soils at low to medium elevations.

Ecology 
Animals naturally avoid the plant.

Toxicity 
The plant is poisonous due to the cardiac glycosides and resins it contains. Escalating doses usually cause vomiting and diarrhea. Other symptoms include dizziness, colour hallucinations, cold sweats, and excessive urination. In extreme cases, the heart rate may slow before fatal convulsions. Young milkweed shoots must be distinguished from those of the androsemus leaf beetle because they appear at the same time.

Uses 
Native Americans used spreading dogbane in numerous ways. The plant was used as a medicine to treat ailments including headaches, convulsions, ear ache, heart palpitations, colds, insanity, dizziness, rheumatism, scrofula, and syphilis. The plant can also be used as a contraceptive. Among the Ojibwe, the root was used as a gynecological, oral, and throat aid, as well as an analgesic for headaches and a diuretic during pregnancy.  The Ojibwe also consumed the root of the plant during the medicine lodge ceremony. The Forest Potawatomi made medicinal use of the roots as well, and the Prairie Potawatomi used the plant's fruits to treat heart and kidney problems. The stem fibers of the plant are very strong, and Native Americans used them as a thread for sewing. Outside of the Americas, spreading dogbane was also used to treat heart disease in Europe during the first half of the 20th century.

References

External links

 
 
 CalFlora Database, University of California: Apocynum androsaemifolium
 
 
 Montana Plant Life
 Plants of Wisconsin

Apocyneae
Flora of Canada
Flora of the Eastern United States
Flora of the Western United States
Flora of Northeastern Mexico
Flora of Subarctic America
Flora of Alaska
Flora of the Great Lakes region (North America)
Flora of California
Flora of the Cascade Range
Flora of the Klamath Mountains
Flora of the Sierra Nevada (United States)
Natural history of the California chaparral and woodlands
Plants described in 1753
Taxa named by Carl Linnaeus
Medicinal plants of North America
Butterfly food plants
Flora without expected TNC conservation status